The Nevada Millennium Scholarship, also known as the Governor Guinn Millennium Scholarship, offers Nevada high school graduates free or reduced tuition to in-state universities and colleges like the University of Nevada, Reno and University of Nevada, Las Vegas.

In 1999, Governor Kenny Guinn’s Millennium Scholarship initiative was enacted into law by the Nevada Legislature; the legislation (NRS 396.911) created the Millennium Scholarship trust fund to be administered by the State Treasurer. In October 1999, the Board of Regents adopted policy guidelines for the administration of the scholarship. 

Although there are a number of pathways to the Millennium Scholarship, by far the most common will be the successful completion of a rigorous program of study at a Nevada high school.
 You must graduate with a diploma from a Nevada class of the year 2000 or later;
 You must complete high school with at least an unweighted 3.25 grade point average calculated using all high average may be weighted or unweighted. You must pass all areas of the Nevada High School Proficiency Examination; and
 You must have been a resident of Nevada, for at least two of your high school years.

The scholarship was created using the money that Nevada received from the Tobacco Master Settlement Agreement. Currently, the scholarship allows up to $80 per credit hour for eligible students with a total lifetime value of $10,000.

References

External links

Nevada Treasurer's Fact Sheet on the Scholarship 

Scholarships in the United States
Student financial aid in the United States
Education in Nevada